Planet of the German Navy is the most modern naval research ship within NATO. It was built as a SWATH design in order to reduce the hull volume and to increase the ship's stability, particularly in high seas and at high speed.

It is used for geophysics and naval technology trials and research. While technically not armed, it is equipped with torpedo launch capability. Other weapons systems can be installed for weapon trials.

References

Auxiliary ships of the German Navy
Auxiliary research ship classes
Auxiliary ships of Germany
Small waterplane area twin hull vessels
Research vessels of Germany
Military catamarans